Qazi Abdul Waheed (born 16 April 1922) was a field hockey player from Pakistan who played for Pakistan's National Field Hockey Team at the 1952 Summer Olympics. In Helsinki the team came in fourth after losing the bronze medal match to England.

See also
List of Pakistani field hockey players

References

External links
 

1922 births
Possibly living people
Place of birth missing
Olympic field hockey players of Pakistan
Pakistani male field hockey players
Field hockey players at the 1952 Summer Olympics
Asian Games medalists in field hockey
Field hockey players at the 1958 Asian Games
Asian Games gold medalists for Pakistan
Medalists at the 1958 Asian Games
20th-century Pakistani people